The Biggest Loser is a British reality television show that began airing on Sky Living from 2005 to 2006, before moving to ITV in 2009 and finished in 2012. Most recently hosted by Davina McCall, the show is a spin-off of the American reality television show of the same name.

The show originally featured Angie Dowds and Mark Bailey as the personal trainers, with Richard Callender replacing Bailey from series 3. After Dowds died in 2011, she was replaced by Charlotte Ord and Rob "The Killer" Edmond for the fifth series.

The first two series of the show were hosted by Vicki Butler-Henderson on Living TV, the third series was hosted by Kate Garraway and Davina McCall began presenting the show in its fourth series on ITV.

In September 2012, it was announced that the show would be cancelled, with no further series planned.

Format
The basic format of the show is that overweight contestants compete to win a cash prize by losing the highest percentage of their starting body weight.

In its first two series, it was an individual competition, even though the contestants train together in teams, and immunity from elimination is initially based on team competitions. The red team was trained by Angie Dowds, who used a hard no-nonsense approach. The blue team was trained by Mark Bailey, who trained with a more nurturing approach.

In the first two series, the winner received £25,000 in cash, the third series winnings was reduced to £10,000 but was reverted to the £25,000 cash prize as of the fourth series.

The third series changed to the new 'couples' format, where 8 pairs of friends, relatives or colleagues started together for the first 5 weeks, before they got split up into a 'black team', trained by Angie Dowds, and a 'blue team', trained by Richard Callender, and started competing against each other, similar to the first two series.

Series overview

Locations
The first few weeks of the competition are recorded at Stanford Hall (aka The Biggest Loser House). For one week, all of the contestants travel to the USA. The final was pre-recorded at The London Studios in 2011 and The Maidstone Studios in 2012.

References

External links

"Article from Hull and East Riding" at Hull and East Riding Article about the new show.

2000s British reality television series
2005 British television series debuts
2010s British reality television series
2012 British television series endings
British television series based on American television series
British television series revived after cancellation
ITV game shows
Sky Living original programming
English-language television shows
Television series by Banijay
Television shows set in England
UK
Obesity in the United Kingdom